The Florida Trail is one of eleven National Scenic Trails in the United States. It currently runs , from Big Cypress National Preserve (between Miami and Naples, Florida along the Tamiami Trail) to Fort Pickens at Gulf Islands National Seashore, Pensacola Beach. Also known as the Florida National Scenic Trail (which applies only to its federally certified segments), the Florida Trail provides permanent non-motorized recreation opportunity for hiking and other compatible activities and is within an hour of most Floridians. The Florida National Scenic Trail is designated as a National Scenic Trail by the National Trails System Act of 1968 (Public Law 90-543).

With its first blaze marked by members of the Florida Trail Association at Clearwater Lake Recreation Area in the Ocala National Forest, the Florida Trail began on October 29, 1966.  The Florida Trail was officially designated as a National Scenic Trail in 1983.  The U.S. Forest Service, through the National Forests in Florida program, is the official administrator of the Florida National Scenic Trail (FNST), but trail development, maintenance, and management are a result of volunteers and land managers throughout the state.

History 
In the early 1960s, Miami resident Jim Kern headed to North Carolina with his brother for a hike on the Appalachian Trail. Returning to Florida and knowing there was nowhere near his home to go backpacking, he envisioned a  hiking trail across Florida. He founded the Florida Trail Association and encouraged members to join him in the vision of creating a trail across the state. His initial hike, a media event for the Miami Herald, took him from the wilds of Big Cypress to Highlands Hammock State Park near Sebring. By October 1966, Kern had spoken with the managers of the Ocala National Forest and received permission to start blazing a hiking trail. After a feasibility study, the trail was officially designated in 1983 as a National Scenic Trail. The Florida Trail has been underway as a volunteer-driven construction project ever since. Like many other National Scenic Trails, the Florida Trail has been built in disconnected segments, created in a corridor where public land (or easements granted by private individuals) is available to route the trail.

FNST partners

Land managers 
The Florida National Scenic Trail is managed by more than 25 different agencies and private partners. Partnerships, memorandums of understanding, and certification agreements between these agencies, land managers and owners, and the USDA Forest Service create unique management opportunities to celebrate Florida’s natural, cultural, and historic resources via the FNST.
Land managers include the National Park Service, South Florida Water Management District, St. Johns River WMD, Suwannee River WMD, Northwest Florida WMD, US Army Corps of Engineers, US Air Force, Florida Fish and Wildlife Conservation Commission, Forever Florida, Florida Forest Service, Seminole County, US Forest Service, FDEP-Division of Recreation & Parks, Florida Department of Military Affairs, Plum Creek Timber Company, City of Blountstown, Florida Department of Transportation, Nokuse Plantation, Santa Rosa Island Authority, Escambia County, the University of West Florida, and US Fish & Wildlife Service.

Stewardship partners 
The Florida Trail Association is a non-profit partner of the FNST, administering a volunteer program to construct, maintain, and garner support for the Trail.  Dedicated volunteers monitor the condition of the Trail and associated facilities.

The FNST Coalition 
The FNST Coalition was established in 2010 by the Forest Supervisor of the National Forests in Florida with the goal of engaging a broader group of partners to manage the Trail and serve recreationists. The Coalition is composed primarily of agency, district, or company leaders who own or manage the land through which the FNST passes. The FNST Coalition’s engagement of a diverse group of stakeholders will continue to make the Trail a high quality, recreational resource. The Florida National Scenic Trail 5-Year Strategic Plan  was released in 2012, setting goals for trail completion, standards, partnerships, and FNST promotion. Coalition members participate in bi-annual meetings to address emerging issues and to exchange resources such as expertise, funding, and information.

FNST route 
The  Florida National Scenic Trail consists of four main geographic regions:

Regions 

 The Southern Region consists of:
 Big Cypress National Preserve 
 Miami Canal Levee L1, L2, L3
 Lake Okeechobee & Okeechobee North
 Kissimmee River Lands
 Avon Park Air Force Range
 KICCO Wildlife Management Area
 The Central Region consists of: 
 Three Lakes Wildlife Management Area
 Forever Florida
 Herky Huffman/Bull Creek Wildlife Management Area
 Tosohatchee Wildlife Management Area
 Seminole Ranch Conservation Area
 C.H. Bronson State Forest
 Mills Creek Woodlands
 Little Big Econ State Forest & Flagler Trail
 Cross Seminole Trail
 Lower Wekiva River Preserve State Park
 Seminole State Forest
 Ocala National Forest
 The Cross Florida Greenway
 Withlacoochee State Forest
 Green Swamp Wild Management Area
 The Northern Region consists of:
 Rice Creek Conservation Area
 Etoniah Creek State Forest & Palatka-Lake Butler State Trail
 Plum Creek
 Osceola National Forest & Olustee Battlefield
 Fall Creek
 Forest Service Tracts & Stephen Foster Culture Center State Park
 Swift Creek Conservation Area & Camp Branch Conservation Area
 Suwannee River Farms Management Areas
 Holton Creek Conservation Area & Lower Alapaha Conservation Area
 Suwannee River State Park
 Twin Rivers State Forest
 Aucilla River
 The Panhandle Region consists of:
 St. Marks National Wildlife Refuge
 Tallahassee-St. Marks Historic Railroad State Trail
 Apalachicola National Forest
 Blountstown Greenway & SR 20
 Upper Chipola Water Management Area
 Econfina Creek Water Management Area
 Pine Log State Forest
 Nokuse Plantation & Choctawhatchee River Water Management Area
 Eglin Air Force Base
 Yellow River Water Management Area
 Gulf Islands (Gulf Islands National Seashore, Santa Rosa County, Navarre Beach, Pensacola Beach)

Additional trails 
 Western Corridor
 Blackwater River State Forest & Blackwater River State Park
 Lake Okeechobee Scenic Trail
 Ocean to Lake Trail

Flora and fauna
 
Florida is home to a unique range of environments not seen anywhere else in the world; this means that there are amazing wildlife and nature viewing opportunities on the FNST.  The Trail crosses both urban and remote wilderness areas, and traverses a variety of semi-tropical ecosystems.  From swamps to forests to prairies to springs, there are endless habitat exploration opportunities. 

 Types of Plant Life by Region
 Southern Region:  Swamplands and pine flatwoods are common in the Southern Region of the FNST.  The Trail passes through cypress swamp, pine, prairies of cabbage palm, saw palmetto, sawgrass, marsh, oak hammocks, and scrub.
 Central Region:  Palmetto prairies, pine flatwoods, ranch land, cypress sloughs, freshwater marshes, scrub, and oak hammocks are found in the Central Region.
 Northern Region:  Longleaf pine and wiregrass are common features in the Northern Region of the Trail.  Additionally, users can find flatwoods, pine plantations, hardwoods, cypress, and oak hammocks. 
 Panhandle Region:  Users can encounter salt marsh, hardwood hammocks, coastal pine flatwoods, pine savannas, wild ground orchids, pitcher plants, titi swamp, hydrangea, magnolia, liverworts, and dune grasses in the Panhandle Region.
 Types of Wildlife by Region
 Southern Region:  Common wildlife in the Southern Region includes panthers, Florida black bears, cattle, alligators, and a wide variety of birds.
 Central Region:  Sandhill cranes, wood storks, cattle, white-tailed deer, feral hogs, wild turkey, bobwhite quail, river otters, alligators, Red Widow spider, Florida pine snake, black bears, and gopher tortoises are all found in the Central Region. 
 Northern Region:  Common wildlife includes red-cockaded woodpeckers, gopher tortoises, black bears, eastern cottontail rabbits, wild turkeys, deer, red-tailed hawks, gators, and Gulf sturgeon.
 Panhandle Region:  Waterfowl, bald eagles, ospreys, otters, alligators, deer, black bears, warblers, sea turtles, and piping plovers can be spotted in the Panhandle Region.
 Cautionary
 There are six species of venomous snake in Florida: Eastern Diamondback Rattlesnake, Southern Copperhead, Cottonmouth/Water Moccasin, Timber Rattlesnake, Dusky Pigmy Rattlesnake, and Coral Snake.  Eastern Diamondback Rattlesnakes, Dusky Pigmy Rattlesnakes, and Coral Snakes are found across the entire state of Florida.  The Southern Copperhead is typically only found in the Panhandle of Florida, whereas  the Timber Rattlesnake is found in northeastern and north central parts of the state, with few sightings in the panhandle.  There are two species of Cottonmouth/ Water Moccasin found in Florida: the Florida Cottonmouth and the Eastern Cottonmouth.  The Florida Cottonmouth is found throughout the state, while the Eastern Cottonmouth is found only in the western edge of the panhandle of Florida.

FNST resources 
 Access to the ArcGIS map is available online here and through the ArcGIS App on smartphones. 
 KMZ files are available via the FNST website here for use in Google Earth and handheld GPS units. These files include the full official FNST route, campsites, trailheads, and unofficial connectors.

References

External links
 Florida National Scenic Trail: US Forest Service page
 Florida Trail Association
 USDA Forest Service: National Forests in Florida
 Florida Greenways & Trails Guide
 American Trails: Florida
 GORP.com: Florida National Scenic Trail
 Trailjournals.com: Read what it's like to hike the Florida Trail
 iNaturalist Project for the Suwannee River area of the Florida Trail

Hiking trails in Florida
Long-distance trails in the United States
National Scenic Trails of the United States
Big Cypress National Preserve
Great Eastern Trail
1966 establishments in Florida